The following is a list of events affecting radio broadcasting in 2014. Events listed include radio program debuts, finales, cancellations, and station launches, closures and format changes, as well as information about controversies.

Notable events

January

February

March

April

May

June

July

August

September

October

November

December

Debuts

Closings

Deaths
January 17: Larry Monroe, 29-year veteran with KUT radio in Austin, Texas
February 6: Ralph Kiner, 91. Radio and television commentator for the New York Mets.
February 15: Angelo Henderson, 51. Radio host at WCHB and minister.
February 25: Jim Lange, 81. Radio host (KGO, KFRC, KABL and KSFO/San Francisco, KMPC/Los Angeles, KKSJ/San Jose) and TV host.
March 1: Porky Chedwick, 96. Longtime Pittsburgh-area rhythm and blues radio host.
March 5: Geoff Edwards, 83. Radio host (KFMB, KFI, KMPC, KSUR) and TV host.
March 25: Ralph Wilson, 95. Radio station owner in the 1950s and 1960s; better known for his ownership of the Buffalo Bills in his later years.
April 6: Mickey Rooney, 93. Star of the radio series Shorty Bell and The Hardy Family.
April 11: Michael Hightower, 58. Radio personality in the Milwaukee radio market (was evening host at WJMR-FM until his death; alumni of WNOV, WAWA, WMCS, WLUM-FM and WKKV-FM)
April 27: Dr. Jack Ramsay, 89. Former basketball coach, later radio and television analyst (best known in radio for his work on ESPN Radio)
May 3: Ben Hoberman, 92. Radio executive (developer of talk format for KABC/Los Angeles, president of ABC Radio)
May 4: Wild Bill Scott, 68. Founder of Z Rock.
May 28: Dave Herman, 78. Disc jockey at several stations in the New York/New Jersey area.
June 1: Tom Rounds, 77. Founder of Radio Express and co-founder of American Top 40.
June 15: Casey Kasem, 82. Co-founder and host of American Top 40 and its spin-offs from 1970 to 2009, radio and television voice-over artist.
June 30: Bob Hastings. American radio, film, and television character actor. 
July 4: Richard Mellon Scaife, 82. Media mogul; longtime co-owner of KQV/Pittsburgh.
July 7: Dick Jones, 87. Voice of Henry Aldrich on the hit radio drama The Aldrich Family from 1943 to 1944.
July 28: Margot Adler, 68. Correspondent for NPR.
August 11: Robin Williams, 63. American actor/comedian who portrayed radio disc jockey Adrian Cronauer in the 1987 film Good Morning, Vietnam
August 12: Lauren Bacall, 88. Star of the radio series Bold Venture.
August 19: Don Pardo, 96. Radio and television announcer who spent 70 years as an in-house announcer for NBC Radio and Television.
August 21: Gerry Anderson, 69. Northern Irish radio broadcaster
October 3: Kevin Metheny. Radio executive (Clear Channel) and programmer (notably with WNBC/New York City, WGN/Chicago, and, at the time of his death, KGO & KSFO/San Francisco)
October 6: Bill Campbell, 91. Philadelphia-area sportscaster and radio personality with WIP, WCAU, and KYW.
October 21: Dale Dorman, 71. Disc jockey best known for his long run on Boston radio (WRKO, WXKS-FM, and WODS) from 1968 to 2010; member of Rock and Roll Hall of Fame.
November 3: Tom Magliozzi, 77. Auto mechanic and comedian; best known as "Click Tappet," co-host of Car Talk with Click and Clack.

References

 
Radio by year